Saur Valley (also Soar) is a small valley,  long and  wide, which resembles Kashmir Valley, located in Pithoragarh district of Uttarakhand state of India. Pithoragarh town (the headquarters of the district) is situated in this valley. The valley is surrounded by beautiful mountains, slopes gently to the south-east, and is bisected into north and south by a tubular ridge of slate, limestone and greenstone originating in the mountains to the north-west and branching down to the south-east. One can have panoramic views of the vast snow range extending across Trishuli, Nanda Devi, Panchchuli Group, and Api of Nepal from the place named Chandak, located on a nearby  hill. Most Manu, near Chandak, hosts an annual fair.

History
Saur was under Kumaon Kingdom, Saur was ruled by Katyuri Kings. Some remnants of their forts of Ajayemerukot, Unchakot, Bhatkot, Bailerkot, Udaypurkot, Dumrakot, Sahajkot, Bamuakot, Dewarkot, and Dunikot are still present, In 1449, the Chand kings displaced katyuri kings from saur, and Prithivi Gosaein built a fort named Pithora Garh, for which the area was later named.

See also
 Darma Valley
 Johar Valley
 Pithoragarh district

References

Valleys of Uttarakhand
Geography of Pithoragarh district